Eremalauda is a genus of larks in the family Alaudidae.

It contains the following species:
 Dunn's lark (Eremalauda dunni)
 Arabian lark (Eremalauda eremodites)

References

Eremalauda
Bird genera
Taxa named by William Lutley Sclater